The Jewish Cemetery of Vukovar (known also as the New Jewish Cemetery) is a cemetery with approximately 75 to 100 remaining monuments which was used between 1850 and 1948. The oldest tombstone dates back to 1858 with multiple languages used in inscriptions including Hebrew, Hungarian, German and Croatian. The Ceremonial Hall or Zidduk-hadin (built between 1926 and 1928) was designed by Fran Funtak in Art-Deco and Moorish revival style. The first Jewish Cemetery in Vukovar was established in 1830.

See also
 Vukovar Synagogue

References

Vukovar
19th-century establishments in Croatia
1940s disestablishments in Croatia
Jews and Judaism in Croatia
History of Vukovar
Cemeteries in Croatia